Klonów may refer to the following places in Poland:
Klonów, Lower Silesian Voivodeship (south-west Poland)
Klonów, Łódź Voivodeship (central Poland)
Klonów, Lesser Poland Voivodeship (south Poland)
Klonów, Świętokrzyskie Voivodeship (south-central Poland)
Kłonów, Masovian Voivodeship (east-central Poland)